Elding is a surname. Notable people with the surname include:

Anthony Elding (born 1982), English footballer and coach
Read Elding, British governor of Bahamas

See also
Elling (name)